George Oscar Sylvester (14 September 1898 – 26 October 1961) was a Labour Party politician in England.

He was elected as Member of Parliament (MP) for Normanton in West Yorkshire at a by-election in 1947 following the resignation of the Labour MP Tom Smith.

Before going into politics, he was a miner. At the 1950 general election, he was returned for the neighbouring Pontefract constituency, and held the seat until he died in office aged 63. At the 1962 Pontefract by-election held after his death, the seat was held for Labour by Joe Harper.

References

External links 
 

1898 births
1961 deaths
Labour Party (UK) MPs for English constituencies
National Union of Mineworkers-sponsored MPs
UK MPs 1945–1950
UK MPs 1950–1951
UK MPs 1951–1955
UK MPs 1955–1959
UK MPs 1959–1964

English miners